Osericta is a genus of South American jumping spiders that was first described by Eugène Louis Simon in 1901.  it contains only two species, found only in Brazil and Peru: O. cheliferoides and O. dives.

References

Salticidae genera
Salticidae
Spiders of South America
Taxa named by Eug%C3%A8ne Simon